The macroscopic scale is the length scale on which objects or phenomena are large enough to be visible with the naked eye, without magnifying optical instruments. It is the opposite of microscopic.

Overview
When applied to physical phenomena and bodies, the macroscopic scale describes things as a person can directly perceive them, without the aid of magnifying devices. This is in contrast to observations (microscopy) or theories (microphysics, statistical physics) of objects of geometric lengths smaller than perhaps some hundreds of micrometers.

A macroscopic view of a ball is just that: a ball. A microscopic view could reveal a thick round skin seemingly composed entirely of puckered cracks and fissures (as viewed through a microscope) or, further down in scale, a collection of molecules in a roughly spherical shape (as viewed through an electron microscope). An example of a physical theory that takes a deliberately macroscopic viewpoint is thermodynamics. An example of a topic that extends from macroscopic to microscopic viewpoints is histology.

Not quite by the distinction between macroscopic and microscopic, classical and quantum mechanics are theories that are distinguished in a subtly different way. At first glance one might think of them as differing simply in the size of objects that they describe, classical objects being considered far larger as to mass and geometrical size than quantal objects, for example a football versus a fine particle of dust. More refined consideration distinguishes classical and quantum mechanics on the basis that classical mechanics fails to recognize that matter and energy cannot be divided into infinitesimally small parcels, so that ultimately fine division reveals irreducibly granular features. The criterion of fineness is whether or not the interactions are described in terms of Planck's constant. Roughly speaking, classical mechanics considers particles in mathematically idealized terms even as fine as geometrical points with no magnitude, still having their finite masses. Classical mechanics also considers mathematically idealized extended materials as geometrically continuously substantial. Such idealizations are useful for most everyday calculations, but may fail entirely for molecules, atoms, photons, and other elementary particles. In many ways, classical mechanics can be considered a mainly macroscopic theory. On the much smaller scale of atoms and molecules, classical mechanics may fail, and the interactions of particles are then described by quantum mechanics. Near the absolute minimum of temperature, the Bose–Einstein condensate exhibits effects on macroscopic scale that demand description by quantum mechanics.

In the Quantum Measurement Problem the issue of what constitutes macroscopic and what constitutes the quantum world is unresolved and possibly unsolvable. The related Correspondence Principle can be articulated thus: every macroscopic phenomena can be formulated as a problem in quantum theory. A violation of the Correspondence Principle would thus ensure an empirical distinction between the macroscopic and the quantum.

In pathology, macroscopic diagnostics generally involves gross pathology, in contrast to microscopic histopathology.

The term "megascopic" is a synonym. "Macroscopic" may also refer to a "larger view", namely a view available only from a large perspective (a hypothetical "macroscope"). A macroscopic position could be considered the "big picture".

High energy physics compared to low energy physics
Particle physics, dealing with the smallest physical systems, is also known as high energy physics. Physics of larger length scales, including the macroscopic scale, is also known as low energy physics. Intuitively, it might seem incorrect to associate "high energy" with the physics of very small, low mass-energy systems, like subatomic particles. By comparison, one gram of hydrogen, a macroscopic system, has ~  times the mass-energy of a single proton, a central object of study in high energy physics. Yet, the macroscopic realm is "low energy physics", while that of quantum particles is "high energy physics".

The reason for this is that the "high energy" refers to energy at the quantum particle level. While macroscopic systems indeed have a larger total energy content than any of their constituent quantum particles, there can be no experiment or other observation of this total energy without extracting the respective amount of energy from each of the quantum particles – which is exactly the domain of high energy physics. Daily experiences of matter and the Universe are characterized by very low energy. For example, the photon energy of visible light is about 1.8 to 3.2 eV. Similarly, the bond-dissociation energy of a carbon-carbon bond is about 3.6 eV. This is the energy scale manifesting at the macroscopic level, such as in chemical reactions. Radioactive decay gamma rays are considered as part of nuclear physics, rather than high energy physics.

Finally, when reaching the quantum particle level, the high energy domain is revealed. The proton has a mass-energy of ~ ; some other massive quantum particles, both elementary and hadronic, have yet higher mass-energies. Quantum particles with lower mass-energies are also part of high energy physics; they also have a mass-energy that is far higher than that at the macroscopic scale (such as electrons), or are equally involved in reactions at the particle level (such as neutrinos). Relativistic effects, as in particle accelerators and cosmic rays, can further increase the accelerated particles' energy by many orders of magnitude, as well as the total energy of the particles emanating from their collision and annihilation.

See also
High energy physics
Microscopic scale
Quantum realm

References

Concepts in physics
Orders of magnitude